Burraton Coombe is a village forming a suburb on the west side of Saltash in Cornwall, England.

References

Populated places in Cornwall